Hutan Melintang is a state constituency in Perak, Malaysia that was represented in the Perak State Legislative Assembly from 1959 and is currently represented in 2018. The current state assemblywoman for Hutan Melintang is Wasanthee Sinnasamy from Pakatan Harapan. Hutan Melintang is currently located under the Bagan Datuk federal constituency.

The state constituency was created in the 1958 redistribution and was mandated to return a single member to the Perak State Legislative Assembly under the first past the post voting system.

Demographics

History

Polling Districts
According to the federal gazette issued on 31 October 2022, the Hutan Melintang constituency is divided into 22 polling districts.

Representation history

Election Results

References

Sources
http://www.federalgazette.agc.gov.my/outputp/pub_20160429_P.U.(B)197.pdf 

Perak state constituencies